The Louisville Cardinals women's soccer team represent University of Louisville in the Atlantic Coast Conference (ACC) of NCAA Division I women's college soccer. The team has never won the ACC regular season championship, but has won both the Big East and Conference USA regular season championship once. The team has advanced to the NCAA Women's soccer tournament 5 times, never making it past the second round.

History

1980s
The Louisville women's soccer program began in 1985, under the direction of head coach Chip Wilkinson.  Wilkinson stayed on staff for three years, until 1987.  Under his direction, the team never had a winning season, coming the closest in their inaugural season.  In 1985 the team finished 8–9–0.  Sandy Davis was hired as the head coach for one year, 1988, and lead the team to a 6–11 record.  In 1989, Jeff Yan and Melissa Mattingly were co-head coaches and the team saw no improvement finishing 6–10–0.

1990s
Jeff Yan was retained as head coach for 1990 and 1991, but the team regressed.  Finishing a combined 7–27–1 in his two years as sole head coach.  To start the 1992 season, Sam Asamoah was hired as head coach.  His first season was a struggle, seeing the team improve slightly to finish at 5–12–1.  The team saw a big jump in 1993, when they finished with their first winning season in program history at 11–7–0.  In 1995, the team joined Conference USA and won a share of the regular season title that year, finishing 4–1–0 in the conference.  This success proved fleeting as Asamoah left as head coach after the season.  Tony Colavecchia took over in 1996 and the team finished 9–9–2.  The downturn continued in 1997 with a 7–13–0 season as Karla Thompson took over as head coach after a 5–1 start and saw out the decade.  The 1998 and 1999 seasons, were the two worst in program history.  The Cardinals won only one game in the two-year span.

2000s
To start the decade Karen Ferguson (later Karen Ferguson-Dayes) was hired as the new head coach. Her first season was difficult, with the team going 1–18–1 in her first season.  However, the team continued to improve, increasing their win totals each year until 2005.  2004 was a bit of a breakthrough with the team finishing tied for fourth in Conference USA, and qualifying for the conference tournament for the first time since 1997.  Following that solid season, the Cardinals moved to the Big East Conference in 2005.  Their new venture proved successful, as the Cardinals finished no lower than fourth in their division and qualified for the Big East Conference Women's Soccer Tournament their first four years in the conference.  The team finished as runners up in the conference tournament in 2006 and 2007.  Along with the runner up finishes, the Cardinals qualified for their first two NCAA Tournaments. However, the team lost in the first round in both tournaments.  2009 proved to be a bump in the road, as the team finished 5–11–1, seventh in the division, and did not qualify for the conference tournament.

2010s
The 2010s began well, with the Cardinals winning double digit games in the first four years of the decade.  They also qualified for the Big East Tournament in 2010 and 2012, including another runner up finish in 2011.  In 2013, the Cardinals moved to the American Athletic Conference.  Their only season there would prove a successful one.  The team finished 12–5–2 and qualified for both the AAC Tournament and the NCAA Tournament.  However, the team would lose in the first round of both.  Their membership in the AAC would last only one year, and the team moved to the Atlantic Coast Conference in 2014.  Life in the ACC would prove difficult at first with the Cardinals finishing with no more than 9 wins in a season between 2014 and 2017.  The team did not qualify for the ACC Women's Soccer Tournament nor the NCAA Tournament in any of those years.  Their best conference finish during this period was eighth in 2014.  2018 proved to be a turnaround year, with the Cardinals finishing 12–7–0 and qualifying for both the ACC and NCAA tournaments.  The season ended with first round losses in both those tournaments.  The Cardinals closed the decade with another successful season, finishing 13–5–2 with their best ever ACC finish of fourth place.  They made the second round of the NCAA Tournament for the second time in program history.

2020s 
The decade started with a season shortened by the COVID-19 pandemic.  The team played only four non-conference games and played a shortened eight game ACC schedule.  The team finished in sixth place, but lost in the first round of the ACC Tournament.  The team returned to a more normal schedule in 2021 and posted a 7–7–2 overall record along with a 3–6–1 ACC record to finish in 11th place, their lowest conference finish since joining the ACC.  2022 did not bring much improvement as the team finished 6–8–2 overall and 3–7–0 in ACC play to finish in tenth place.

Personnel

Current roster

Team management

Source:

Seasons

†In 1995, Louisville began play in Conference USA.
^In 2005, Louisville began play in the Big East Conference.
‡In 2013, Louisville played one season in the American Athletic Conference before moving to the Atlantic Coast Conference in 2014.

Notable alumni

Current Professional Players 

 Christine Exeter (2010–2013) – Currently with Darby FC
 Sydney Blomquist (2011–2012) – Currently with Avaldsnes
 Erin Yenney (2011–2014) – Currently with Fenerbahçe
 Charlyn Corral (2012–2013) – Currently with Pachuca
 Chinyelu Asher (2014) – Currently with AIK
 Gaby Vincent (2015–2018) – Currently with Washington Spirit
 Kathellen Sousa (2016) – Currently with Real Madrid
 Emina Ekic (2017–2020) – Currently with Racing Louisville

References

External links
 
 2016 Record Book

 
Soccer clubs in Kentucky
NCAA Division I women's soccer teams